Nikos Sakellaridis (born 30 September 1970) is a retired Greek football defender.

References

1970 births
Living people
Greek footballers
Makedonikos F.C. players
Iraklis Thessaloniki F.C. players
Apollon Smyrnis F.C. players
Veria F.C. players
Panionios F.C. players
PAS Giannina F.C. players
Agrotikos Asteras F.C. players
Super League Greece players
Association football defenders
Greece international footballers
Footballers from Thessaloniki